Krishna Nagar Assembly constituency is one of the seventy Delhi assembly constituencies of Delhi in northern India. Krishna Nagar assembly constituency is a part of East Delhi Lok Sabha constituency. AAP's S.K.Bagga defeated BJP's CM candidate Kiran Bedi by 2277 votes in the 2015 assembly election.

Members of Legislative Assembly
Key

Election results

2020

2015

2013

2008

2003

1998

1993

References

Assembly constituencies of Delhi
Delhi Legislative Assembly